Toyota Racing may refer to:

 Toyota Gazoo Racing
 Toyota Motorsport GmbH
 Toyota Racing (Formula One team)
 Toyota Racing Development
 Toyota Racing Series

See also
 Toda Racing, Japanese corporation
 Toyota Supra in motorsport
 Toyota in motorsport